Marc Biancarelli (born 1968) is a Corsican novelist and writer. Born in 1968, he teaches the Corsican language in a high school in southern Corsica. He is the author of several books in Corsican, one of which Murtoriu has been translated into French by Jérôme Ferrari, Marc-Olivier Ferrari et Jean-François Rosecchi and published by Actes Sud.

References

1968 births
Living people
People from Corsica
Corsican writers
20th-century French novelists
20th-century French male writers
21st-century French novelists
French male novelists
21st-century French male writers